Nur Atikah Nabilah (born 27 November 1991, Singapore), is a gymnast. Nabilah was part of the team that won the team gold medal at the 2005, 2007 & 2011 Southeast Asian Games.

References

1991 births
Living people
Singaporean female artistic gymnasts
Southeast Asian Games gold medalists for Singapore
Southeast Asian Games silver medalists for Singapore
Southeast Asian Games medalists in gymnastics
Competitors at the 2005 Southeast Asian Games
Competitors at the 2007 Southeast Asian Games
Competitors at the 2011 Southeast Asian Games